Gernot Ymsén-Kerschbaumer, previously Gernot Kerschbaumer, is an Austrian orienteering competitor born in 1983 in Vorau. At the World Games in 2013 he won a bronze medal in the mixed relay, together with Anna Nilsson Simkovics, Robert Merl and Ursula Kadan.

Kerschbaumer's most recent success was in the 2018 European Orienteering Championships, where he received the Bronze medal in the Long Distance event in Switzerland.

He lives in Kristianstad and competes for Pan-Kristianstad.

References

External links
 
 Gernot Kerschbaumer at World of O Runners
 

Living people
Austrian orienteers
Male orienteers
Foot orienteers
World Games bronze medalists
Competitors at the 2013 World Games
Year of birth missing (living people)
Competitors at the 2017 World Games
World Games medalists in orienteering